Get Your Phil is the sixth studio album released by Disappear Fear. This release marks the return of the harmonizing vocals of sisters: Sonia Rutstein (SONiA) and Cindy Frank (CiNDY); which have not been featured since the group's 1996 album, Seed in the Sahara. The album has been described as, "100% made in America, folk music." All tracks are songs written by Phil Ochs, except for "Because the Night" which was penned by Patti Smith and Bruce Springsteen. The album was released on July 4, 2011. Cindy said of the release date, "We think a new anti-war album released on Independence Day is a great idea and we hope that Phil would be proud." The majority of the instrumentation on the album is done by Sonia. She plays the acoustic guitar, piano and harmonica. The album was engineered and produced by Grammy nominee, John Jacob.

Track listing

Personnel
Disappear Fear
Sonia Rutstein (SONiA) – vocals, acoustic guitar, piano, harmonica
Cindy Frank (CiNDY) – vocals

Additional personnel
Tony Correlli – piano, engineer

References

External links

Disappear Fear albums
2011 albums
Self-released albums
Phil Ochs tribute albums